Wasilków  is a city in north-eastern Poland, about 8 km north of Białystok, with 8,751 inhabitants (2004).

It is situated in Białystok County, in Podlaskie Voivodeship (since 1999, having previously been in Białystok Voivodeship from 1975 to 1998).

External links
 
 

Cities and towns in Podlaskie Voivodeship
Białystok County
Trakai Voivodeship
Sokolsky Uyezd
Białystok Voivodeship (1919–1939)
Belastok Region